Odone may refer to :

Cristina Odone (1960-) is an Italian journalist, editor, and writer living in the United Kingdom. 
Lorenzo Odone (1978–2008) was an American Adrenoleukodystrophy (ALD) patient whose parents sought a treatment for the disease. 
Augusto and Michaela Odone, inventors of Lorenzo's oil, a treatment for ALD
Odone Belluzzi, an Italian engineer